Maria Nyerere (born Maria Waningu Gabriel Magige; December 31, 1930) served as the inaugural First Lady of Tanzania from 1964 to 1985. She was the seventh of nine children of Gabriel Magige, of Baraki, Tareme by his wife Hannah Nyashiboha.

Nyerere was educated at the White Sisters' School at Nyegina, followed by Ukerewe School, then as a boarding scholar at Sumve Teacher Training College; she attained a teaching certificate there, and began teaching at Nyegina Primary School at Musoma. She married Julius Nyerere in 1953.

She currently serves as one of ten members of the council of elders of the Alliance for Tanzania Youth Economic Empowerment (Atyee), which also includes former Union President Ali Hassan Mwinyi and former Zanzibar President Amani Abeid Karume. She is commonly known as Mama Maria in the Tanzanian media.

References

1930 births
First Ladies of Tanzania
Living people
Tanzanian Roman Catholics